Frottage may refer to:
 Frottage, sexual rubbing; non-penetrative sex
 Frot, male-on-male non-penetrative sex
 Tribadism, female-on-female non-penetrative sex
 Frottage (art), technique
Fudgie Frottage, drag king

See also
 Frotteurism, a non-consensual paraphilia